Humphrey of Toron may refer to:

 Humphrey I of Toron, Norman from Italy, fl. 1115
 Humphrey II of Toron (1117–1179), lord of Toron and constable of the Kingdom of Jerusalem, son of the above
 Humphrey III of Toron
 Humphrey IV of Toron (c. 1166 – before 1197), lord of Toron, Kerak, and Oultrejordain in the Kingdom of Jerusalem